The 2019 Staysure Tour was the 28th season of the European Senior Tour, the professional golf tour for men aged 50 and above operated by the PGA European Tour. The season was officially called the Staysure Tour after UK-based insurance company Staysure.

Schedule 
The 2019 schedule consisted of 19 events.

The numbers in brackets after the winners' names show the number of career wins they had on the European Senior Tour up to and including that event. This is only shown for players who are members of the tour.

  

For the tour schedule on the European Senior Tour's website, including links to full results, click here.

Qualifying school
The qualifying school was played in Portugal in late January 2019. There were two 36-hole "stage 1" events with the leading players in these events joining a number of exempt players in the 72-hole final stage. There were just five qualifying places available for the 2019 season.  There was a cut after 54 holes with players more than eight shots away from the fifth qualifying place not playing the final round.

The following five players gained their places on the 2019 tour:

Little beat Peter Wilson with a birdie at the second playoff hole.

Order of Merit leaders
A points-based system was used instead of one based on prize money. Tournaments had different points values with the three majors carrying 10,000 points and the remaining 16 events carrying between 2,500 and 4,500 points.

There is a complete list on the official site here.

References

External links 

 

European Senior Tour
European Senior Tour